"Angie" is a song by the English rock band The Rolling Stones, featured on their 1973 album Goats Head Soup. It also served as the lead single on the album, released on 20 August 1973.

Background
The song is credited, as most Rolling Stones songs are, to both Mick Jagger and Keith Richards, but it is acknowledged to be almost completely written by Richards, with Jagger contributing some of the lyrics. "Angie" was recorded in November and December 1972 and is an acoustic guitar-driven ballad characterizing the end of a romance. The song's distinctive piano accompaniment, written by Richards, was played on the album by Nicky Hopkins, a Rolling Stones recording-session regular. The strings on the piece (as well as on another song, "Winter") were arranged by Nicky Harrison. An unusual feature of the original recording is that singer Mick Jagger's vocal guide track (made before the final vocals were performed) is faintly audible throughout the song (an effect sometimes called a "ghost vocal").  Cash Box said that "Jagger is at his best-slurring words by the dozens to ring out the feeling of every important line."

Released as a single in August 1973, "Angie" went straight to the top of the US Billboard Hot 100 and reached No. 5 on the UK singles chart. The song was also a No. 1 hit in both Canada and Australia for five weeks each and topped the charts in many countries throughout Europe and the rest of the world.

Because of the song's length, some radio stations made edits to shorten it to 3 minutes, omitting the longer coda and the second instrumental section of the song.

There was speculation that the song was about David Bowie's first wife Angela, Keith Richards' newborn daughter Dandelion Angela, the actress Angie Dickinson, and others. In 1993, in an interview for the liner notes to the Rolling Stones' compilation album Jump Back: The Best of The Rolling Stones, Richards said that the title was inspired by his baby daughter. However, in his 2010 memoir Life, Richards said that he had chosen the name at random when writing the song – before he knew that his baby would be named Angela or even knew that his baby would be a girl – and that the song "was not about any particular person." According to NME, Jagger's contributions to the lyrics referred to his breakup with Marianne Faithfull.

The Rolling Stones have frequently performed the song in concert; it's included in set lists on their 1973, 1975 and 1976 tours; it's available on two of their "Vault" recorded concerts including 1973 Brussels Affair (using electric guitars with Mick Taylor soloing) and Live at the L.A. Forum 1975 (played by Keith Richards and Ron Wood acoustically). It has been a touring staple since their 1982 European Tour. Concert renditions were released on the albums Stripped, Live Licks and The Rolling Stones: Havana Moon.

"Angie" was covered by Welsh rock band Stereophonics in 1999, as the B-side to the single "Hurry Up and Wait". The song was also included on the 2010 deluxe re-issue of their 1999 second studio album Performance and Cocktails.

Personnel

According to authors Philippe Margotin and Jean-Michel Guesdon:

The Rolling Stones
 Mick Jagger vocals
 Keith Richards acoustic guitar
 Mick Taylor acoustic guitar
 Bill Wyman bass
 Charlie Watts drums

Additional personnel
Nicky Hopkins piano
Nicky Harrison string arrangement

Music video
Two music videos were shot to promote the song.

Charts

Weekly charts

Year-end charts

Certifications and sales

References

1970s ballads
1973 singles
The Rolling Stones songs
Billboard Hot 100 number-one singles
Cashbox number-one singles
Number-one singles in Australia
Number-one singles in Switzerland
Number-one singles in Norway
RPM Top Singles number-one singles
Songs written by Jagger–Richards
Rock ballads
Tori Amos songs
Song recordings produced by Jimmy Miller
Music videos directed by Michael Lindsay-Hogg
British soft rock songs
1973 songs
Glam rock songs